The International Cricket Council telecasts a weekly program on television about the cricketing world called ICC Cricket 360°. It is produced by IMG.

It is a weekly 30 minute program & provides the latest cricket news, recent cricket action including all Twenty20, Test cricket and One-Day International matches, as well as off-field features and interviews.

The show is televised by 11 different broadcasters in 110 countries and has an audience of about 95 million people worldwide. This show covers almost all aspects of world cricket.

International airings

See also

International Cricket Council
Cricket
IMG

References

External links
Official website of the ICC

Cricket World
Cricket on television